HMS Actaeon was a 28-gun Enterprise-class sixth-rate frigate of the Royal Navy.

History
The Actaeon was first commissioned in June 1775 under the command of Captain Christopher Atkins.

In August 1775, she was driven ashore at Lymington, Hampshire. She was refloated on 31 August and taken in to Portsmouth, Hampshire for repairs.

References 

Sources
 Robert Gardiner, The First Frigates, Conway Maritime Press, London 1992. .
 David Lyon, The Sailing Navy List, Conway Maritime Press, London 1993. .
 Rif Winfield, British Warships in the Age of Sail, 1714 to 1792, Seaforth Publishing, London 2007. .

 

1775 ships
Sixth-rate frigates of the Royal Navy
Ships built in Woolwich
Maritime incidents in 1776
Maritime incidents in 1775